The Ozan Mosque - ( Azerbaijani Ozan məscidi ) is a historical and architectural monument of the 19th century located in the city of Ganja , Azerbaijan . Ozan Mosque was built in Ganja in 1884.

History 
The Ozan Mosque was built in the Ozan quarter of the city of Ganja. Residents of the quarter took an active part in the construction of the mosque. Construction dates back to 1884. This mosque is also called Haji Abbasli Mosque. A kitabe in Arabic has been preserved above the entrance to the mosque. Thanks to the kitab, it became possible to establish the year of construction of the mosque. However, due to damage to the inscription on the kitab, there is no information about the architect of the building.

In the 12th issue of the magazine " Molla Nasreddin " for 1907, it was reported that in 1906, residents of the neighborhood of the Ozan quarter collected 2,000 manats to repair the mosque building. The mosque functioned and served the believers until 1920 . In 1920, during the Ganja rebellion, the mosque was partially destroyed. After the establishment of Soviet power in Azerbaijan, like many other religious institutions, it was closed.

According to the decision No. 132 of the Cabinet of Ministers of the Republic of Azerbaijan adopted on August 2, 2001, the Ozan Mosque was included in the List of Immovable Monuments of History and Culture of Local Importance. In 1979, the Ozan Mosque was restored. In 2007, restoration work was carried out in the mosque. 

Currently, the Ozan mosque serves the population as a religious library. There are translations of the "Holy Qur'an" in Azerbaijani, Russian and Turkish languages, various books about the Islamic religion, as well as photographs of many shrines considered sacred by Muslims, donated by Ganja believers. Conversations and events related to the propagation of Islam are often held here.

Architectural features 
The mosque resembles a simplified version of the Shah Abbas Mosque . The mosque was built of red brick traditional for Ganja . The total area of the mosque is 357.8 m². As in other quarter mosques of Ganja, there are no minarets here . The mosque has a rectangular shape with a dome . The main part of the mosque is a square prayer hall covered with a dome. There are 2 auxiliary rooms on the sides. *The special patterned masonry of red brick gives the facade of the mosque a special look.

References

1884 establishments
Ganja, Azerbaijan